Staines High Street railway station was a railway station that formerly served the town of Staines (now Staines-upon-Thames), on the Windsor & Eton line of the London and South Western Railway.

History
The station was opened on 1 July 1884 and closed on 30 January 1916 It was built to serve Staines for trains to and from the west using a short chord connecting the Windsor line to the line from Staines to Reading.

When passenger services were removed, the chord remained in use for occasional freight traffic until the mid-1960s after which the chord embankment was removed. A car park stands on the site of the chord and no traces of the station remain.

References

External links
AirTrack website

Disused railway stations in Surrey
Former London and South Western Railway stations
Railway stations in Great Britain opened in 1884
Railway stations in Great Britain closed in 1916
Staines-upon-Thames